Luberon (known as Côtes du Luberon until 2009) is a French wine-growing AOC in the southeastern extreme of the Rhône wine region of France, where the wines are produced in 36 communes of the Vaucluse département. The neighbouring appellation of Ventoux AOC stretches along its northern border and is separated by the Calavon river. The southern limit of the region is marked by the Durance river.

Economy
The Luberon wines are produced by a total of 495 concerns which include 480 growers, 55 private wineries, 14 cooperative wineries, and one producer/merchant. 
The vineyards are in the communes of Ansouis, Apt, La Bastide-des-Jourdans, La Bastidonne, Beaumont-de-Pertuis, Bonnieux, Cabrières-d'Aigues, Cadenet, Castellet, Cheval-Blanc, Cucuron, Goult, Grambois, Lacoste, Lauris, Lourmarin, Maubec, Ménerbes, Mérindol, Mirabeau, La Motte-d'Aigues, Puget, Puyvert, Robion, Saignon, Saint-Martin-de-Castillon, Saint-Martin-de-la-Brasque, Sannes, Taillades, La Tour-d'Aigues, Vaugines, Villelaure, Vitrolles-en-Luberon.

Wines

Red wines are made from Grenache noir and Syrah (minimum 60%, of which Syrah minimum 10%), Cinsault (maximum 20%), and Carignan (maximum 20%). Other accepted varieties are: Counoise, Gamay noir, Mourvèdre, Pinot noir.

Rosé: The same varieties are used as for the red, and up to 20% of the allowed varieties for white wine may be used.

White wines from Ugni blanc (maximum 50%), Roussanne & Marsanne (combined maximum of 20%), Clairette blanche, Grenache blanc, Vermentino, and Bourboulenc.

The minimum alcohol content for all three colors is 11%.

History 
The wines received AOC status in 1988, under the name Côtes du Luberon. The name change to Luberon took place on 23 September 2009.

References

External links
 of AOC Luberon wines
Luberon on vins-rhone.com

Rhône wine AOCs
1988 establishments in France